Arantxa Sánchez was the defending champion but did not compete that year.

Radka Zrubáková won in the final 7–6, 6–4 against Mercedes Paz.

Seeds
A champion seed is indicated in bold text while text in italics indicates the round in which that seed was eliminated.

  Jana Novotná (quarterfinals)
  Radka Zrubáková (champion)
  Manon Bollegraf (semifinals)
  Sandra Wasserman (quarterfinals)
  Neige Dias (first round)
  Brenda Schultz (quarterfinals)
  Mercedes Paz (final)
  Angelika Kanellopoulou (second round)

Draw

External links
 1989 Belgian Open Draw

Belgian Open (tennis)
1989 WTA Tour